The Socialist Republic of Slovenia, commonly referred to as Socialist Slovenia or simply Slovenia, was one of the six federal republics forming Yugoslavia and the nation state of the Slovenes. It existed under various names from its creation on 29 November 1945 until 25 June 1991. In 1990, while the country was still part of the Yugoslav federation, the League of Communists of Slovenia allowed for the establishment of other political parties, which led to the democratization of the country.

Etymology
The official name of the republic was Federal Slovenia (Slovene: Federalna Slovenija, Serbo-Croatian: Federalna Slovenija / Федерална Словенија) until 20 February 1946, when it was renamed the People's Republic of Slovenia (Slovene: Ljudska republika Slovenija, Serbo-Croatian: Narodna Republika Slovenija / Народна Република Словенија). It retained this name until 9 April 1963, when its name was changed again, this time to Socialist Republic of Slovenia.

On 8 March 1990, the Socialist Republic of Slovenia removed the prefix "Socialist" from its name, becoming the Republic of Slovenia, though remaining a constituent state of the Socialist Federal Republic of Yugoslavia until 25 June 1991, when it enacted the laws resulting in independence.

Independence

In September 1989, numerous constitutional amendments were passed by the Assembly of the Socialist Republic of Slovenia, which introduced parliamentary democracy to the country. The same year Action North both united the opposition and democratized communist establishment in Slovenia as the first defense action against Milošević's supporters' attacks, leading to Slovenian independence.

The word 'Socialist' was removed from the name of the then state on 7 March 1990. The socialist infrastructure was largely dissolved. The first open democratic election was held on 8 April 1990. The parliamentary elections were won by the opposition, known as the DEMOS coalition led by the dissident Jože Pučnik. At the same time, Milan Kučan, the former chairman of the League of Communists of Slovenia (ZKS), was elected President of the Republic. The democratically elected parliament nominated the Christian Democratic leader Lojze Peterle as Prime Minister, which effectively ended the 45-year-long rule of the Communist Party. During this period, Slovenia retained its old flag and coat of arms, and most of the previous symbols as it awaited the creation of new symbols that would eventually come after independence. The old national anthem, Naprej zastava slave, had already been replaced by the Zdravljica in March 1990.

On 23 December 1990, a referendum on independence was held in Slovenia, at which 94.8% of the voters (88.5% of the overall electorate) voted in favour of secession of Slovenia from Yugoslavia. On 25 June 1991, the acts about the Slovenian independence were passed by the Assembly. Following a short Ten-Day War, the military of Slovenia secured its independence; by the end of the year, its independence was recognized by the wider international community.

See also 

 Subdivisions of the Kingdom of Yugoslavia

References

Communism in Slovenia

Socialist Federal Republic of Yugoslavia
Slovenia
20th century in Slovenia
Political history of Slovenia
1945 establishments in Slovenia
1990s disestablishments in Slovenia
1945 establishments in Yugoslavia
1991 disestablishments in Yugoslavia
Slovenia
States and territories disestablished in 1991

Slovenia